The Carlton Academy is a secondary school in Nottinghamshire, previously known as The Wheldon School and Sports Academy. The school is sponsored by the Redhill Academy Trust, and was judged as being a good school by OFSTED in 2013. This was confirmed in 2017.

The Academy has 800 students across years 7 to 11 and a sixth form of 100 students. In September 2014, students from the local  Sherwood E-Act Academy  which was to close, were moved to the academy. Students in Years 7 and 8 at Sherwood would not have been able to continue  their education there and were integrated into Carlton.

Academics
Virtually all maintained schools and academies follow the National Curriculum, and are inspected by Ofsted on how well they succeed in delivering a 'broad and balanced curriculum'. Schools endeavour to get all students to achieve the English Baccalaureate qualification – this must include core subjects a modern or ancient foreign language, and either History or Geography.

The school operates a two-year, Key Stage 3 where all the core National Curriculum subjects are taught. Year 7 and Year 8 study core subjects: English, Mathematics, Science with PE, and Philosophy, Religion & Ethics. The following subjects are taught: Modern Languages, History, Geography, Art, Design Technology, Drama, Music and Computing. Teaching can be mixed ability or setted.

The Academy runs a 3 year Key Stage 4  to allow students more time to study their preferred subjects to examination level. English, Mathematics, Science, PE, and Philosophy, Religion & Ethics are continued, with four options to form an individual pathway for each student.

Students all sit the Philosophy, Religion & Ethics GCSE and one option in Year 10- freeing time to consolidate maths and English in Year 11. This is known as the Year 10 Option, the subjects offered include GCSE Dramam BTEC Sport, Digital Information Technology, Creative Media Production, GCSE Photography, Child Development & Care, Hospitalityand Catering, GCSE Design & Technology, and Enterprise.

The second option is choosing between History, Geography, Spanish and French. They then can select two subjects from a pool.
The pool contains:
Triple Science, Geography, History, French, Spanish, PE, Sport, Fine Art, Art Graphics, Photography, Business Studies, Computer Science, Digital IT, eCreative Media, Engineering, Food and Nutrition, Hospitalityand Catering, Design &Technology, Sociology, Psychology, Child Development & Car, Drama, and Music.

The sixth form, Key Stage 5, offers A levels in  Mathematics, Further Mathematics, Physics, Biology,    Chemistry, Computer Science,    Design Technology, English Language,   English Literature,   Art Photography,  Fine Art, Media Studies, Graphic Communication, Music, Drama, Geography, History,  Politics, Psychology, Sociology, French and Spanish. 
Level 3 BTECs in Applied Science, Business, Health & Social Care, IT, Sports. With Physical Education, Philosophy, Religion and Ethics (PRE).

Visits
In 2014, students were visited by the local MP Vernon Coaker.

Notable alumnus
 TommyInnit, YouTuber and Twitch streamer

References

External links
 Carlton Academy website
 Carlton Academy prospectus
 Nottingham Post Comparisons

2011 establishments in England
Academies in Nottinghamshire
Educational institutions established in 2011
Secondary schools in Nottinghamshire